Les Cyclopes is a baroque music ensemble based in Caen, France. They were established in Cologne, Germany, in 1987, with musicians from France, Canada, Argentina, and the United States. They eventually settled in Basse-Normandie, France, in 1990. The primary musicians are Bibiane Lapointe (harpsichord) and Thierry Maeder (organ), with additional musicians added as necessary. The group may perform as a harpsichord duo, chamber ensemble, miniature opera group, or orchestra.

Les Cyclopes have performed in France, Belgium, Germany, Italy, and the United States, and have been invited to festivals in Utrecht and Montpellier. Since 1997 they have been in residence at the Musée des Beaux-Arts de Caen.

The group has released seven CDs of baroque music, mostly by little-known and little-recorded European composers such as Christlieb Siegmund Binder, Jacques Aubert, N. Lebègue, Matthias Weckman, J. A. Reincken, and Johann Pachelbel. Their recordings have received several awards.

External links
Les Cyclopes official site

Musical groups established in 1987
Instrumental early music groups
Caen